Pratap Singaram is a village in Medchal district in Telangana, India. It falls under Ghatkesar mandal. Established in the year 1363 by a person named Rami Reddy, it was originally named as Prathapa Shinghavaram after Kakatiya king Pratapa Rudra.

References

Villages in Medchal–Malkajgiri district